Field Marshal Richard Michael Power Carver, Baron Carver,  (24 April 1915 – 9 December 2001) was a senior British Army officer. Lord Carver served as the Chief of the General Staff (CGS), the professional head of the British Army, and then as the Chief of the Defence Staff (CDS), the professional head of the British Armed Forces. He served with distinction during the Second World War and organised the administration of British forces deployed in response to the Mau Mau Uprising in Kenya and later in his career provided advice to the British government on the response to the early stages of The Troubles in Northern Ireland.

Military career
Born the son of Harold Power Carver and Winifred Anne Gabrielle Carver (née Wellesley) and educated at Winchester College and the Royal Military College, Sandhurst, Carver was commissioned as a second lieutenant into the Royal Tank Corps on 1 February 1935. He was promoted to lieutenant on 31 January 1938.

He served in the Second World War initially organising logistics at the Headquarters of 7th Armoured Division which was engaged in fighting the Italians in North Africa: he was mentioned in despatches on 1 April 1941 and again on 8 July 1941 and awarded the Military Cross on 9 September 1942. Promoted to captain on 31 January 1943, he was given the temporary rank of lieutenant-colonel and appointed Commanding officer of the 1st Battalion, Royal Tank Regiment on 14 April 1943, leading them in North Africa for which he was awarded the Distinguished Service Order (DSO) on 4 May 1943 and in Italy for which he was awarded a Bar to his DSO on 24 February 1944. He was appointed Commander of 4th Armoured Brigade on 27 June 1944 and led his brigade in the campaign in North West Europe. He was also appointed a Commander of the Order of the British Empire in 1945.

Carver became a Technical Staff officer to the Ministry of Supply in 1947, and having been promoted to the substantive rank of major on 31 January 1948, he became Assistant Quartermaster-General (Plans) at Headquarters Allied Forces Central Europe in May 1951 and then head of the exercise planning staff at SHAPE in October 1952. Having been promoted to lieutenant-colonel on 27 March 1954 and to colonel on 17 June 1954, he was appointed Deputy Chief of Staff at East Africa Command in June 1954; he took part in the closing stages of the response to the Mau Mau Uprising in Kenya for which he was mentioned in despatches on 19 July 1955. He was then elevated to Chief of Staff in East Africa in October 1955 and appointed a Companion of the Order of the Bath on 8 March 1957. He was appointed Director of Plans at the War Office in February 1958, Commander of the 6th Brigade at Münster in January 1960 and General Officer Commanding (GOC) of the 3rd Division with the rank of major-general on 4 September 1962. His division was deployed to Cyprus in February 1964. He was made Director of Army Staff Duties at the Ministry of Defence on 7 October 1964 and famously substantially reduced the size of the Territorial Army (TA).

Having been advanced to a Knight Commander of the Order of the Bath in the 1966 Queen's Birthday Honours, he was made General Officer Commanding Far East Land Forces with the rank of lieutenant-general on 28 July 1966, tri-service Commander-in-Chief of Far East Command in 1967 and, having been promoted to full general on 29 March 1968, General Officer Commanding Southern Command on 12 May 1969. After being advanced to Knight Grand Cross of the Order of the Bath in the 1970 Birthday Honours, he was appointed Chief of the General Staff on 1 April 1971 in which role he provided advice to the British government on the response to the early stages of The Troubles in Northern Ireland. Having been promoted to field marshal on 18 July 1973, he became Chief of the Defence Staff on 21 October 1973 before retiring in October 1976. In July 1977 he became a life peer as Baron Carver, of Shackleford in the County of Surrey.

Carver was also Colonel Commandant of the Royal Electrical and Mechanical Engineers from February 1966, of the Royal Tank Regiment from January 1968, of the Bristol University Officer Training Corps from March 1972 and of the Royal Armoured Corps from April 1974.

In August 1977 he was appointed resident commissioner designate for Rhodesia with responsibility for ending the dispute over independence there but resigned after fourteen months of deadlock. He wrote a number of books on military history and was a vocal critic of Britain's Trident missile programme, believing that as the American nuclear strike capability was sufficiently powerful it was inefficient for Britain to have an independent program.

His interests included sailing, tennis and gardening. He died on 9 December 2001 in Fareham, Hampshire.

Family
In 1947 he married Edith Lowry-Corry, a granddaughter of Henry Lowry-Corry; they had two sons and two daughters. Lady Carver died in 2019. Carver's mother was related to Arthur Wellesley, 1st Duke of Wellington.

References

Partial list of publications
 Carver, Michael. Imperial War Museum Book of the War in Italy: A Vital Contribution to Victory in Europe 1943–1945
 Carver, Michael. & Robertson, Ian G. The National Army Museum Book of the Turkish Front 1914–18: The Campaigns at Gallipoli, in Mesopotamia and in Palestine
 Carver, Michael. Twentieth-Century Warriors: The Development of the Armed Forces of the Major Military Nations in the Twentieth Century
 Carver, Michael. War Since 1945
 Carver, Michael. The Seven Ages of the British Army
 Carver, Michael. Dilemmas of the Desert War: The Libyan Campaign 1940–1942 (London, B. T. Batsford Ltd, 1986; reprinted Spellmount Limited, Staplehurst, Kent, 2002)
 Carver, Field Marshal Lord. El Alamein (London, B. T. Batsford Ltd, 1962)
 Carver, Field Marshal Lord. Britain's Army in the 20th Century
 Carver, Michael. Tobruk (London, B. T. Batsford Ltd, 1964)

Further reading

External links
Guardian obituary
BBC obituary
Independent obituary
Imperial War Museum Interview
War and Peace in the Nuclear Age; Zero Hour; Interview with Michael Carver, 1987
Generals of World War II

|-
 

|-
 

|-
 

|-

1915 births
2001 deaths
People educated at Winchester College
British field marshals
British Army brigadiers of World War II
Commanders of the Order of the British Empire
Crossbench life peers
Knights Grand Cross of the Order of the Bath
British military writers
Recipients of the Military Cross
Historians of World War II
Royal Tank Regiment officers
British military historians
Companions of the Distinguished Service Order
Chiefs of the General Staff (United Kingdom)
Chiefs of the Defence Staff (United Kingdom)
Military personnel from Surrey
Graduates of the Royal Military College, Sandhurst
Life peers created by Elizabeth II